Soldat  , plural Soldats  Soldaten  Soldater , may refer to:

 Soldat (horse)
 Soldat (rank), lowest rank of enlisted men in the land-based armed forces of Germany, Austria, and Switzerland
 Soldat (Romania), lowest rank of armed forces of Romania
 "Soldat" (song), by Aya Nakamura
 Soldat (video game)
 Soldat Island, Australian Antarctic Territory
 Soldat Jahman (born 1979), French hip hop performer
 Soldat Ustinov (born 1960), ring name of American professional wrestler
 Soldaten (Gurlitt), opera by Manfred Gurlitt 1930
 Die Soldaten, opera by Zimmermann 1965
 Ihor Soldat (born 1991), Ukrainian football defender
 Marie Soldat-Roeger (1863–1955), Austrian violinist
 , novel by the Austrian Nazi Party author :de:Mirko Jelusich 1939
 Die Soldaten (play), (de) play by Jakob Michael Reinhold Lenz 1776

See also
 Soldier (disambiguation)